At This Time (Live) is the third release and the first live album from the Albany-based pop rock band Sirsy. It was recorded live at E. O'Dwyers in Saratoga Springs, New York and released on October 29, 2002.

Track listing
This Time
Anyway
Paper Moon
Dry
Whenever You're Around
Kiss Me Here
IOU
Soon
Please Let Me Be
Wishless
She Says
At Last (available only on limited first run)
Crybaby (acoustic demo version)

2002 live albums
Sirsy albums